West Heath may refer to:

Places
West Heath, Cheshire, in Congleton, England
West Heath, Hampshire, England
West Heath, London, in Bexley, London
West Heath, West Midlands, in Birmingham, England
The West Heath, an extension of Hampstead Heath in North London

Schools
West Heath Girls' School (1865-1997), a girls' boarding school in Sevenoaks, Kent, England
West Heath School (special school), a special school in Sevenoaks, Kent, England

Other uses
West Heath House and West Heath Yard, Channel 4 sitcoms created by Edwyn Collins